Alexander Peters is a Belizean footballer who currently plays for Freedom Fighters in the Premier League of Belize and the Belize national team.

International career 
Peters made his national team debut for Belize on 5 August 2018 in a 1–0 friendly win against Barbados.

He made his competitive debut for his country on 16 November 2018 in a 1–0 win against Puerto Rico in a 2019–20 CONCACAF Nations League qualifying match.

References 

1991 births
Living people
Belizean footballers
Belize international footballers
Premier League of Belize players
Association football forwards
Altitude FC (Belize) players
Freedom Fighters FC players